Camelia may refer to:
 Camelia (singer) (born 1974), Malaysian singer and model
 Camelia (actress) (19191950), Egyptian actress
 Camelia (name), a list of people with the name
 Camelia, a character in the  Camelia la Texana
 Camelia, the mascot of the Raku programming language
 Camelia (1954 film), a Mexican film
 USS Camelia (1862), an American ship
 957 Camelia, an asteroid

See also 
 Camellia (disambiguation)
 Kamelia